Jerai may refer to:
Jerlun, Kedah
Jerlun, Perak
Jerlun (federal constituency), represented in the Dewan Rakyat
Jerlun-Langkawi (federal constituency), formerly represented in the Dewan Rakyat (1974–95)
Jerlun-Kodiang (state constituency), formerly represented in the Kedah State Legislative Council (1959–74)
Jerlun-Langkawi (state constituency), formerly represented in the Kedah State Legislative Council (1974–95)